St George the Martyr Holborn is an Anglican  church located at the south end of Queen Square, Holborn, in the London Borough of Camden. It is dedicated to  Saint George, and was originally so-called to distinguish it from the later nearby church of St. George's Bloomsbury, with which it shared a burial ground (now St George's Gardens). While the historical name remains its formal designation, it is today known simply as St George's Holborn.

History
The church was built in 1703–06 by Arthur Tooley, as a chapel of ease to St Andrew, Holborn. Tooley was paid £3,500 to build the chapel and two houses by a group of fifteen trustees including Sir Streynsham Master. It was later bought by the Commission for Building Fifty New Churches  and became a parish church in 1723, receiving the dedication to St George, in honour of Streynsham Master's governorship of Fort St George in India.

The antiquary William Stukeley was the rector from 1747 to his death there in 1765.

The church was remodelled in the early nineteenth century by J.B. Papworth, who added a bell-tower and two frontages to what had previously been a plain brick building, and once again in 1867–69 by S. S.Teulon, who almost entirely changed the exterior, removed the galleries and added the present columns and roof.

After the death of Joseph Stalin the Rev. Stanley Evans, M.A. gave a memorial service in his honour on March 13, 1953.

It was at this church that Ted Hughes and Sylvia Plath married on Bloomsday in 1956.

Conservation
The church was designated a Grade II* listed building on 24 October 1951.

Organ
The organ has been listed as a historic instrument by the British Institute of Organ Studies. The first organ was erected in 1773; it has been rebuilt over the years.

See also
HTB network

Notes

External links
 St George's Holborn homepage
 Diocese of London

Churches completed in 1706
Church of England church buildings in the London Borough of Camden
Grade II* listed churches in London
Grade II* listed buildings in the London Borough of Camden
John Buonarotti Papworth buildings and structures
Buildings and structures in Holborn
18th-century Church of England church buildings
1706 establishments in England
Holy Trinity Brompton plants